Gruev is a Bulgarian masculine surname, its feminine counterpart is Grueva. Notable people with the surname include: 

 Aleksandar Gruev (born 1983), Bulgarian basketball player
 Dame Gruev (1871–1906), Bulgarian teacher
Gruev Cove in Antarctica, named after Dame Gruev
 Iliya Gruev (born 1969), Bulgarian footballer
 Ilia Gruev (footballer, born 2000), Bulgarian footballer
 Vasil Gruev (born 1926), Bulgarian cross country skier
 Yoakim Gruev (died 1912), Bulgarian teacher and translator

Bulgarian-language surnames